Scouting in Washington has a long history, from the 1910s to the present day, serving thousands of youth in programs that suit the environment in which they live.

Early history (1910–1950)
Camp Black Mountain, located on the beautiful shores of Silver Lake an hour drive east of Bellingham, is the oldest existing camp in Washington State. Interviews with Hugh Eldridge Carr and General Floyd Hansen, Bellingham Eagle Scouts from the early 1920s, indicate the camp was active prior to 1919.  The land was used by permission of owner H. P. Jukes (the council treasurer) prior to transferring ownership to the BSA in 1927.  It was originally used by the Bellingham Council as Camp H. P. Jukes and has been in continuous use since that time with the exception of two seasons during WWII (1943 and 1944). Upon first use the camp was used for troop and district events, but became a fully organized resort in 1925. During the 1920s, the camp was supported by the Order of the Blue Knot, an honor camper's society that later became Quilshan Lodge, Order of the Arrow. Programs from the 1925 and 1926 seasons provide insight into early camp activities and vintage photographs of this cherished property.

In 1910, a Spokane, Washington Boy Scout leader, the Reverend David Ferry, created a troop under the name of Girl Guides of America. The Girl Guides did not expand much beyond the local area. In 1911, the Girl Scouts of America (Des Moines, Iowa and to be confused with the current Girl Scouts of the USA) and the Girl Guides planned to merge with the Camp Fire Girls to form the Girl Pioneers of America, but relationships fractured and the merger failed.

Founded in 1919, Camp Parsons is the oldest continuous running Boy Scout camp west of the Mississippi River and one of the oldest continually running Boy Scout camp in the United States on its original location. The original land for the camp was donated by Reginald Parsons in 1918. Thousands of Scouts come to Camp Parsons every summer.

Recent history (1950–present)
In 1993, Tumwater Area(#737), Twin Harbors Area (#607), and Mount Rainier (#612) merged to form the Pacific Harbors Council (#612). In 1992, the North Central Washington Council (#613) and the Fort Simcoe Area Council (#614) merged to become the Grand Columbia Council  (#614).

In 1987, Inland Empire Council changed its name to the Inland Northwest Council (#611). In 1992, Lewis-Clark (#108) and  Idaho Panhandle (#110) councils merged into Inland Northwest. In 1956 the Olympic Area Council was formed, merging into Chief Seattle in 1974. In 1994, the Mount Baker Area (#603) and Evergreen Area (#606) councils merged to become the Mount Baker (#606).

Boy Scouts of America in Washington today
There are seven Boy Scouts of America (BSA) local councils in Washington.

Blue Mountain Council

With headquarters in Kennewick, Washington, the Blue Mountain Council serves Scouts in Washington and Oregon.

History
In 1923, the Blue Mountain Council (#604) was formed. In 1926, the Umatilla Council (#738) (in Oregon) was formed, merging into Blue Mountain in 1927. In 1926, the Eastern Oregon Area Council (#760) (in Oregon) was formed, merging into Blue Mountain in 1932.

Organization
The council has six districts:
Columbia River District serves Kennewick and Finley, Washington
Eastern Oregon District serves Baker, Wallowa, Union, Grant, and Wheeler counties, Oregon
Oregon Trail District serves Umatilla, Wheeler, Gilliam, and Morrow counties, Oregon
Pioneer District serves Walla Walla and Columbia Counties, Washington
Rattlesnake Ridge District serves Richland, West Richland, and Benton City, Washington
White Bluffs District serves Franklin County, Washington

Camps
The Council does not operate a summer camp.
 Camp Wallowa in Joseph, Oregon
 Martin Scout Camp near Pendleton and Pilot Rock, Oregon

Order of the Arrow lodge
 Wa-La-Moot-Kin Order of the Arrow Lodge

Cascade Pacific Council

Cascade Pacific Council serves Scouts in Oregon and Washington.

Chief Seattle Council

The Chief Seattle Council serves the main parts of Puget Sound and Seattle areas including the Olympic Peninsula.

Grand Columbia Council

Located in central Washington and based in Yakima, the Grand Columbia Council serves the Chelan, Douglas, Grant, Kittitas, Okanogan, Yakima and portions of Adams, Benton, Ferry and Klickitat Counties.

History
In 1923, the Columbia District Council (#605) was formed, and ended in 1924.

In 1922, the Wenatchee Council (#613) was formed, and changed its name to North Central Washington (#613) in 1924.

In 1919, the Yakima Council (#614) was formed, and changed its name to Yakima County (#614) in 1924. It changed its name to Yakima Valley Area (#614) in 1925. It changed its name again in 1942 to Central Washington Area (#614), and again in 1954 to Fort Simcoe Area (#614).

In 1992, the North Central Washington Council (#613) and the Fort Simcoe Area Council (#614) merged to become the Grand Columbia Council (#614).

Organization
The council is now divided into three districts Highland District, Basalt Coulee District, and Simcoe District.  It has one service center in Yakima.

Camps
The council operates four camps:

 Camp Fife off of Highway 410 near Bumping Lake
 Camp Bonaparte between Tonasket and Republic on Highway 20
 Camp Scout-A-Vista outside Wenatchee, and

Order of the Arrow lodge
Tataliya Lodge 614

Inland Northwest Council

With headquarters in Spokane the Inland Northwest Council serves Scouts in Washington and Idaho.

The Inland Northwest Council provides the communities and volunteers with a council service center.  The council service center has a Scout Shop and staff to answer questions, provide training and resources, and is able to take registrations for summer camp or events.

In 2009, the council sponsored a statue in Spokane. Titled Footsteps To The Future, it honors community mentors.

History
In 1919 the Nez Perce County Council (#108) (In Idaho) was founded. It changed its name to Lewiston (#108) in 1922. In 1925, it changed its name to Lewis-Clark Area (#108). In 1928 it merged into Spokane Area (#611). In 1922 the Bonner-Boundary Council (#106) (In Idaho) was founded. It merged into the Shoshone County Council (#110) in 1926. In 1918 the Shoshone County Council (#110) (In Idaho) was founded. In 1923, it became the Shoshone-Kootenai Council (#110). In 1928, it changed its name to the Idaho Panhandle Council (#110).

In 1915 the Spokane Council (#611) was founded. It changed its name in 1925 to Spokane Area (#611) in 1925. In 1921 the Palouse Council (#611) was founded, and it merged into the Spokane Area Council (#611) in 1927. In 1931, Spokane Area changed its name to the Inland Empire Council (#611).

In 1987, Inland Empire Council changed its name to the Inland Northwest Council (#611). In 1992, Lewis-Clark (#108) and  Idaho Panhandle (#110) councils merged into Inland Northwest.

Organization
The council has four districts:
 Three Rivers District - Northern Spokane, Stevens and Pend Orielle counties
 Bigfoot District - South Spokane County, Lincoln County, Adams County
 Mountain Lakes District - Kootenai, Bonner, Boundary, Northern Shoshone, and Benewah counties in Idaho
 Appaloosa District - Whitman, Asotin, Columbia, Garfield, Idaho, Latah, Lewis, Nez Perce, and Clearwater counties

Camps
 Camp Easton in Harrison, Idaho
 Camp Grizzly in Harvard, Idaho
 Cowles Scout Reservation in Newport, Washington

Order of the Arrow 
 The Es-Kaielgu Order of the Arrow Lodge serves the council

Mount Baker Council

The Mount Baker Council of the BSA serves Scouts in the Snohomish, Skagit, Whatcom, Island and San Juan counties of Washington.

History
In 1918, the Bellingham Council (#603) was formed. It changed its name to Whatcom County (#603) in 1926. In 1923, the Skagit County Council (#610) was formed. In 1929, Whatcom County and Skagit County councils merged to become the Mount Baker Area Council (#603). In 1918, the Everett Council (#606) was formed. It changed its name to Evergreen Area (#606) in 1941. In 1994, the Mount Baker Area (#603) and Evergreen Area (#606) councils merged to become the Mount Baker (#606).

Organization
The council is made of the following districts:
Pilchuck District: Serves Arlington, Camano Island, Clearview, Darrington, Gold Bar, Granite Falls, Index, Lake Stevens, Lakewood, Maltbey, Marysville, Monroe, Snohomish, and Stanwood. 
Salish Sea District: Serves Bothell, Brier, Edmonds, Everett, Lynnwood, Mill Creek, Mountlake Terrace, Mukilteo, and Silver Firs. 
North Cascade District: Serves Skagit County, Whatcom County, the islands of Whidbey, Fidalgo, and the San Juans.

Camps
 Fire Mountain Scout Reservation] in Mt. Vernon, Washington
 Camp Black Mountain in Maple Falls, Washington was sold in 2015 and no longer operates as a council camp.

Order of the Arrow 
The council's Order of the Arrow lodge is Sikhs Mox Lamonti #338. which was created in 1995 through the merger of Kelcema Lodge #305 and Quilshan #325.  Sikhs Mox Lamonti translates to "Friends of two mountains", which is a reference to the Mount Baker Council's camps Black Mountain and Fire Mountain.

Pacific Harbors Council

The Pacific Harbors Council of serves the scouts in the Pierce, King, Mason, Thurston, Pacific  and Grays Harbor Counties of Washington State. The council operates one Scout camp: Camp Thunderbird. In 1994 the Mount Rainier Council, Tumwater Area Council, and Twin Harbors Council merged to form the Pacific Harbors Council. The council operates two service centers. The main office is located in Tacoma, Washington and the other is located at Camp thunderbird outside of Tumwater, Washington.

History 
In 1918, the Hoquiam Council formed. It closed in 1919. In 1918, the Chehalis Council formed. It closed in 1921. In 1926, the Tumwater Area Council (#737) formed. In 1923, the Grays Harbor County Council (#607) formed, changing its name to Twin Harbors Area Council (#607) in 1930. In 1918, the Tacoma Council (#612) formed, changing its name to Pierce County Council (#612) in 1924. It changed its name again in 1927 to the Tacoma Area Council (#612), and once more in 1948 to Mount Rainier Council (#612). In 1993, Tumwater Area(#737), Twin Harbors Area (#607), and Mount Rainier (#612) merged to form the Pacific Harbors Council (#612).

Organization
Olympic District 
Rainier District

Camps
Camp Thunderbird in Olympia, Washington provides council resident Cub Camp, and serves as a council training center used for NYLT, Wood badge, and  Territory training conference.

Order of the Arrow lodge
 Nisqually Lodge Order of the Arrow serves the council.

Girl Scouting in Washington

There are three Girl Scout councils serving Washington.

Girl Scouts of Western Washington

This council was formed by the merger of Pacific Peaks and Totem Councils on October 1, 2007.  Administrative offices are located in Seattle, Washington.   The new council serves over 26,000 girls.

Regional Offices
DuPont Girl Scout Center, serving South Puget Sound, in DuPont, Washington
Snohomish County Regional Office in Marysville, Washington
East King County Regional Office in Bellevue, Washington
Peninsula Regional Office in Bremerton, Washington
Greater Seattle Regional Office in Seattle, Washington
Southern Counties Regional Office in Longview, Washington
South King County Regional Office in Renton, Washington

Camps
Girl Scout Camp Evergreen is  near Longview, Washington
Girl Scout Camp Klahanee is  near Hoquiam, Washington
Girl Scout Camp Lyle McLeod is  near Belfair, Washington
Girl Scout Camp River Ranch is 430 forested acres in Carnation, Washington including Lake Langlois and is by the Tolt River
Girl Scout Camp St. Albans is  near Belfair, Washington

Girl Scouts of Eastern Washington and Northern Idaho

Girl Scouts Eastern Washington and Northern Idaho was formed on May 1, 2007, by the merger of Girl Scouts Mid-Columbia Council and Girl Scouts Inland Empire Council. It serves Eastern Washington and North Idaho, an area also known as the Inland Empire.

Service Centers
Sandpoint, Idaho
Coeur d'Alene, Idaho
Lewiston, Idaho
Tri-Cities, Washington
Yakima, Washington

Camps

Girl Scouts of Oregon and Southwest Washington

This council was established on October 1, 2008, and serves girls in Clark and Skamania counties.

See also

Scouting in British Columbia

References

External links

Youth organizations based in Washington (state)
Washington
Western Region (Boy Scouts of America)